Crunchbase is a company providing business information about private and public companies. Their content includes investment and funding information, founding members and individuals in leadership positions, mergers and acquisitions, news, and industry trends.

History

Crunchbase was originally founded in 2007 by Michael Arrington as an outside database to track the data of startups featured in articles on the TechCrunch website.

In September 2010, AOL acquired TechCrunch and Crunchbase as one of TechCrunch's portfolio companies. 

In November 2013, AOL entered into a dispute with start-up Pro Populi over the company's use of the entire Crunchbase dataset in apps that Pro Populi developed despite having distributed the data under the Creative Commons CC-BY attribution license. Pro Populi was represented by the Electronic Frontier Foundation. AOL eventually conceded that Pro Populi could continue to use the dataset but adopted the CC BY-NC license for future revisions. As of August 2019, a snapshot of the 2013 dataset is still available for download under the CC-BY license on the Crunchbase website.

In 2014, Crunchbase added incubators, venture capital partners, and a leaderboard feature to the startup database.

In 2015, Crunchbase separated from AOL/Verizon/TechCrunch and went private. In September 2015, in conjunction with the spin out, Crunchbase announced the raise of $6.5 million in funding, followed with a round of $2 million in November. In 2016, the company attempted to show the split from TechCrunch by removing the camel casing of its name (with the "B" in "Base" now being rendered as a small letter), and launched its first product, the paid database Crunchbase Pro. In April 2017, Crunchbase announced an $18 million Series B from Mayfield Fund. At the same time, Crunchbase launched two new products – Crunchbase Enterprise and Crunchbase for Applications.

In 2018, Crunchbase launched "Crunchbase Marketplace".
In October 2019, Crunchbase announced a $30 million Series C led by Omers Ventures. Existing backers Emergence, Mayfield, Cowboy Ventures and Verizon also participated.

Products
Their software includes tools for investment analytics, trend analysis, web traffic review, and marketing. They also carry news regarding startups. Crunchbase Pro is their in-depth search tool.

References

External links
 

AOL
Big data companies
Business intelligence companies
Online companies of the United States
Business services companies established in 2007
Internet properties established in 2007
Knowledge bases
Online person databases
Technology websites
Startup databases